A fascial compartment is a section within the body that contains muscles and nerves and is surrounded by deep fascia. In the human body, the limbs can each be divided into two segments – the upper limb can be divided into the arm and the forearm and the sectional compartments of both of these – the fascial compartments of the arm and the fascial compartments of the forearm contain an anterior and a posterior compartment. Likewise, the lower limbs can be divided into two segments – the leg and the thigh – and these contain the fascial compartments of the leg and the fascial compartments of the thigh.

Structure
If these segments are cut transversely, it is apparent that they are divided into multiple sections. These are called fascial compartments, and are formed by tough connective tissue septa.

These compartments usually have a nerve and blood supply separate from their neighbours. The muscles in each compartment will often all be supplied by the same nerve.

Sometimes the segment is also covered by bone profoundly (as e.g. the brachial fascia). It is distinguished from pharmacokinetic compartment, which is a defined volume of body fluids.

Clinical significance

Compartment syndrome is an acute medical problem following injury or surgery in which increased pressure (usually caused by inflammation) occurs within a compartment.

References 

 Fasciae and Aponeuroses - Organized by Region Department of Anatomy, University of Arkansas for Medical Sciences

Limbs (anatomy)
Fascia